Archie's Pals 'n' Gals was an ongoing comic book series published by Archie Comics featuring Archie and his friends. It originally ran from 1952 to 1991. The title showcased other members of the Archie gang, such as Betty and Veronica, Jughead and Reggie. It was later brought back in the form of a digest magazine in 1992.

Publication history
The most notable issue was 1962's #23, which featured the second appearance of Josie, Melody and Pepper, a week after the debut of the She's Josie comic book.  Josie and Melody would go on to become two-thirds of Josie and the Pussycats in issue #45 of Josie's own title.

In 1992, a year after the 32-page regular-sized comic book was canceled, a new Archie's Pals 'n' Gals Double Digest title was launched, which ran until being canceled in 2011 with issue #146.

See also
 List of Archie Comics Publications

References

Defunct American comics
Archie Comics titles
1952 comics debuts
1991 comics endings
Magazines established in 1952
Magazines disestablished in 1991
Teen comedy comics
Romantic comedy comics
Bimonthly magazines published in the United States
Magazines about comics